Crossing the Border may refer to:

 Crossing the Border (album), an album by Rawlins Cross
 Crossing the Border (short story collection), a collection of short stories by Joyce Carol Oates
 Crossing the Border (film), a 2006 Spanish comedy-drama film